The Bishop of Kilmore and Ardagh was the Ordinary of the Church of Ireland diocese of Kilmore and Ardagh in the Province of Armagh. The Diocese of Kilmore composed most of County Cavan and parts of counties Leitrim, Fermanagh, Meath and Sligo. The Diocese of Ardagh comprised most of County Longford and parts of counties Cavan and Roscommon.

The Episcopal sees of Kilmore and Ardagh were intermittently combined in the 17th and 18th centuries until they were finally united in 1839. They were combined further with Elphin in 1841 to form the united bishopric of Kilmore, Elphin and Ardagh.

List of Bishops of Kilmore and Ardagh

References

Bibliography

 

Kilmore and Ardagh
Bishops of Kilmore or Elphin or of Ardagh